|}

The Noblesse Stakes is a Listed flat horse race in Ireland open to mares and fillies aged four years or older.
It is run at Cork over a distance of 1 mile and 4 furlongs (2,413 metres), and it is scheduled to take place each year in early April.

The race was first run in 2015 and the first two runnings were held Leopardstown. Until 2013 the title was used for a race now known as the Munster Oaks.

Records

Leading jockey (2 wins):
 Pat Smullen – Massinga (2015), Zhukova (2017)
 Billy Lee -  Bloomfield (2018), Moll (2021) 
 Colin Keane -  Heliac (2020), Thunder Kiss (2022) Leading trainer (2 wins):
 Dermot Weld – Massinga (2015), Zhukova (2017) Ger Lyons - Heliac (2020), Thunder Kiss (2022) ''

Winners

See also
 Horse racing in Ireland
 List of Irish flat horse races

References 
Racing Post: 

Flat races in Ireland
Open middle distance horse races
Cork Racecourse